Lovely is the debut studio album by English indie pop band The Primitives, released in 1988. It features the international hit single "Crash", as well as the UK top 100 hits "Stop Killing Me", "Thru the Flowers", and "Out of Reach". "Way Behind Me" was issued as a single after the album's initial release and was later included on re-releases as well as on the follow-up album Pure.

Chart performance
The album reached No. 6 on the UK album charts. It spent 9 weeks on the U.S. Billboard 200 album charts and reached its peak position of No. 106 in October 1988.

Track listing
All songs written by Paul Court, except for where noted.
"Crash" (Court, Steve Dullaghan, Tracy Tracy) - 2:31
"Spacehead" (Court, Dullaghan, Tracy) - 2:11
"Carry Me Home" - 2:54
"Shadow" (Court, Dullaghan, Tracy) - 3:28
"Thru the Flowers" - 2:30
"Dreamwalk Baby" - 2:01
"I'll Stick with You" - 2:33
"Way Behind Me" [bonus track; not on original release] - 3:08
"Nothing Left" (Court, Dullaghan, Tracy) - 3:04
"Stop Killing Me" - 2:04
"Out of Reach" - 2:20
"Ocean Blue" - 3:24
"Run Baby Run" - 2:32
"Don't Want Anything to Change" - 1:52
"Buzz Buzz Buzz" - 2:01

Personnel
The Primitives
Tracy Tracy – lead vocals, tambourine
Paul Court – guitar, vocals
Steve Dullaghan – bass
Tig Williams – drums

Notes 

1988 debut albums
RCA Records albums
The Primitives albums